Himerometridae is a family of echinoderms belonging to the order Comatulida.

Genera:
 Amphimetra Clark, 1909
 Craspedometra Clark, 1909
 Heterometra Clark, 1909
 Himerometra Clark, 1907
 Homalometra Clark, 1918

References

 
Comatulida
Echinoderm families